Mark Stevens (born Richard William Stevens; December 13, 1916 – September 15, 1994) was an American actor, who appeared in films, and on television. He was one of four who played the lead role in the television series Martin Kane, Private Eye; he appeared in 1953–54.

Early life
 
Born in Cleveland, Ohio, Stevens first studied to become a painter before becoming active in theater work. He then launched a radio career as an announcer in Akron, Ohio.

Early career

Warner Bros – as Stephen Richards
Moving to Hollywood, he became a Warner Bros. contract actor at $100 a week in 1943. The studio darkened and straightened his curly red hair and covered his freckles. At first he was billed as Stephen Richards. They gave him small parts, often uncredited, in films like Destination Tokyo (1943), Passage to Marseille (1944), The Doughgirls (1944), Hollywood Canteen (1944), Objective, Burma! (1945), God Is My Co-Pilot (1945), The Horn Blows at Midnight (1945), Rhapsody in Blue (1945) and Pride of the Marines (1945). He usually played soldiers. Eventually the studio let him go.

Career at 20th Century Fox
He was then signed to 20th Century Fox and changed his name to Mark Stevens at the suggestion of Darryl Zanuck.

His first movie for the studio was Within These Walls (1945), fourth-billed, playing the romantic male lead. Stevens was borrowed by RKO to play the lead role in From This Day Forward (1946) with Joan Fontaine.

Back at Fox Stevens was in The Dark Corner (1946) with Lucille Ball and Clifton Webb, a film noir that attempted to repeat the success of Laura (1944). In 1946, exhibitors voted him the fifth-most promising "star of tomorrow".

Fox put him in the musical I Wonder Who's Kissing Her Now (1947), playing Joseph E. Howard. It was a big hit. So too was The Street With No Name (1948), where Stevens played  an FBI man going undercover to arrest a gangster played by Richard Widmark, and The Snake Pit (1948), in which he played Olivia de Havilland's loyal husband.

Stevens was in a Western, Sand (1949) and another musical biopic with Haver, Oh, You Beautiful Doll (1949), playing Fred Fisher. He supported William Powell in Dancing in the Dark (1949).

Stevens was borrowed by MGM to play Matthew Kinston, one of Deborah Kerr's three suitors in Please Believe Me (1950). For Columbia, he starred in the film-noir Between Midnight and Dawn (1950).

Career after 20th Century Fox

Stevens then signed a contract at Universal: Target Unknown (1951), a war film; Katie Did It (1951), a romantic comedy; Little Egypt (1951) with Rhonda Fleming; Reunion in Reno (1951).

In 1951, he starred in the DuMont series News Gal which was later syndicated on ABC in 1957.

Stevens made Mutiny (1952) for the King Brothers and went to England for The Lost Hours (1952).

He was in Torpedo Alley (1953). Stevens took over the lead role in Martin Kane, Private Eye from 1953 to 1954.

From 1954 to 1956, he played a newspaper managing editor in the series Big Town, having replaced Patrick McVey, who starred in the role from 1950 to 1954. Reruns of Big Town began airing on DuMont under the title City Assignment while new episodes of the series were still appearing on CBS.

Career as a Director
In the 1950s and 1960s, he directed several features: Cry Vengeance (1954), Time Table (1956), Gun Fever (1958), Man on a Raft (1958), The Man in the Water (1963), and Sunscorched (1966).

As an actor only, he was in Gunsight Ridge (1956), September Storm (1960), and Fate is the Hunter (1964).

Later career
From the 1960s Stevens lived in semi-retirement in Spain. His occasional film credits include Spain Again (1969) and The Fury of the Wolfman (1972). In the 1980s he made guest appearances on television shows including Magnum, P.I., Murder, She Wrote.

Death
On September 15, 1994, Stevens died of cancer in Majorca, Spain at the age of 77.

For his contribution to the television industry, Mark Stevens has a star on Hollywood's Walk of Fame at 6637 Hollywood Boulevard.

Filmography

Television

Radio

Notes

External links
 
 Mark Stevens at TCMDB
 Mark Stevens at Hollywood Star Walk

1916 births
1994 deaths
20th Century Studios contract players
20th-century American male actors
American expatriates in Spain
American male film actors
American male television actors
Deaths from cancer in Spain
Male actors from Akron, Ohio
Male actors from Cleveland
Western (genre) television actors